The Daytime Emmy Award for Outstanding Pre-School Children's Animated Program had been awarded annually between 2013 and 2021. These shows were previously honored in the Daytime Emmy Award for Outstanding Children's Animated Program category. In November 2021, it was announced that all Daytime Emmy categories honoring children's programming will be retired in favor of a separate Children's & Family Emmy Awards ceremony that will be held starting in 2022.

2010s

2020s

Programs with multiple awards
3 awards
 Tumble Leaf

Total awards
Amazon - 4
PBS - 2
Nickelodeon - 2
Netflix - 1

Multiple Nominations (3 or more)
5 nominations
 Peg + Cat
 Tumble Leaf
3 nominations
 Ask the StoryBots
2 nominations
 Bubble Guppies
 Dinosaur Train
 Wallykazam!

See also

 List of animation awards
 Daytime Emmy Award for Outstanding Children's Animated Program

References

Retired Daytime Emmy Awards
American animation awards